Tiki is the fourth solo studio album by Cameroonian jazz bassist and musician Richard Bona. It was released on October 2, 2005 through Universal Music France, and has charted in several countries.

Susheela Raman, Mike Stern and Djavan made guest appearances on the album,
and the 2006 edition of the record features a song "Please Don't Stop" with guest vocals by John Legend.

Track listing

Chart performance

References

Richard Bona albums
2005 albums